Allochroa layardi is a species of gastropods belonging to the family Ellobiidae.

The species is found in Australia, Malesia, Pacific Ocean.

References

Ellobiidae
Gastropods of Australia
Molluscs of the Pacific Ocean
Gastropods described in 1855